MV Ciara Joie 5 is a passenger ferry owned and operated by Aleson Shipping Lines. She's the former MV Kofuji No.8 and currently acquired by Aleson Shipping.

References 

1987 ships
Ships built in Japan
Ferries of the Philippines
Ships of the Philippines